Cadogan is a surname of Welsh origin and is a variant of the name Cadwgan. Cadogan is also an anglicisation of the Irish surname Ó Ceadagáin. Notable people with the surname include:

Alan Cadogan (born 1993), Irish hurling player.
Alexander Cadogan (1884–1968), British civil servant and Chairman of Board of Governors of the BBC
Charles Cadogan (disambiguation), multiple people
Edward Cadogan (disambiguation), multiple people
Eoin Cadogan (born 1986), Irish Gaelic football and hurling player
Frederick William Cadogan (1821–1904), British barrister and politician
George Cadogan (disambiguation), multiple people
Gerald Cadogan (born 1986), American footballer
Gerald Cadogan, 6th Earl Cadogan (1869–1933), British soldier
Henry Cadogan (disambiguation), multiple people
John Cadogan (1930–2020), British organic chemistry professor
Kevin Cadogan (born 1970), American guitarist and founding member of Third Eye Blind
Kieron Cadogan (born 1990), English footballer
León Cadogan (1899–1973), Paraguayan ethnologist
Mary Cadogan  (1928–2014), English writer on children's fiction
Peter Cadogan (1921–2007), English writer and political activist
Sean Cadogan, Australian physicist, working in Canada
Susan Cadogan (born 1951), Jamaican reggae singer
William Cadogan (disambiguation), multiple people  

Welsh-language surnames
Anglicised Welsh-language surnames